Nye Mountain is a mountain located in Essex County, New York, named after William B. Nye (c.1815–1893), an Adirondack mountain guide. 
Nye Mountain is part of the Street Range of the Adirondack Mountains; it is flanked to the southwest by Street Mountain.

Nye Mountain stands within the watershed of the West Branch of the Ausable River, which drains into Lake Champlain, thence into Canada's Richelieu River, the Saint Lawrence River, and into the Gulf of Saint Lawrence.
The west side of Nye Mtn. drains into the headwaters of the Chubb River, thence into the West Branch.
The north end of Nye Mtn. drains into the Chubb River.
The east side of Nye Mtn. drains into the northern Indian Pass Brook, thence into the Ausable's West Branch.

Nye Mountain is within New York's Adirondack Park.

However, the 1953 survey measured the elevation to be only .
Although Nye and three other mountains are no longer thought to meet the Adirondack Mountain Club's qualifications for the list of High Peaks, the club has chosen to keep the traditional list of peaks, without updating.

See also 
 List of mountains in New York
 Northeast 111 4,000-footers
 Adirondack High Peaks
 Adirondack Forty-Sixers

Notes

External links 
  Peakbagger.com: Nye Mountain-South Peak
  Summitpost.org: Nye Mountain
 

Mountains of Essex County, New York
Adirondack High Peaks
Mountains of New York (state)